The Columbia and Sumter Railroad was a South Carolina railroad that operated immediately after the American Civil War.

The Columbia and Sumter Railroad was chartered by the South Carolina General Assembly in 1866.

The line was sold to the Wilmington, Columbia and Augusta Railroad Company in 1870.

The Wilmington, Columbia and Augusta lasted until 1898 when it was absorbed into the Atlantic Coast Line Railroad.

References

Defunct South Carolina railroads
Railway companies established in 1866
Railway companies disestablished in 1870
1866 establishments in South Carolina
American companies established in 1866
American companies disestablished in 1870
1870 disestablishments in South Carolina